Joe or Joseph Hale may refer to:

Joseph Hale (1913–1985), politician
Joe Hale, founder of Network of International Christian Schools
Joe Hale (animator)

See also
Joseph Haile, historic house